Anastasia Popova (born 4 October 1990) is a Belarusian footballer who plays as a midfielder for Premier League club FC Dinamo Minsk and the Belarus women's national team.

Club career
Popova has played for Zorka-BDU, Isloch-RGUOR, FC Minsk and Dinamo Minsk in Belarus.

International career
Popova capped for Belarus at senior level during two FIFA Women's World Cup qualifications (2011 and 2015) and two UEFA Women's Euro qualifications (2013 and 2017).

References

External links

1990 births
Living people
Footballers from Minsk
Belarusian women's footballers
Women's association football midfielders
FC Minsk (women) players
FC Dinamo Minsk players
Belarus women's international footballers